Boomerang is a boomerang roller coaster located at Worlds of Fun in Kansas City, Missouri. It opened in the 2000 season, replacing the vacancy left by the original Zambezi Zinger's departure in 1997 and used Zambezi's line queue. Since 2005, the line queue and signage has moved. Boomerang is a "cookie-cutter" or "clone" ride, meaning it is not unique to Worlds of Fun and is manufactured by Vekoma for many other parks. Since Worlds of Fun has no Australia/Oceania section, the Boomerang was fitted into the Africa section.

The Ride
Riders are towed up a 116-foot (33.5m), 45° incline and dropped. The train reaches a maximum speed of 47 mph (75.6 km/h), while traveling through the station and into a cobra roll element, inverting the riders twice and turning in the direction of the initial incline. It then travels through a vertical loop and up a section of track that is nearly parallel to the first incline.  Finally, the train repeats the trip, backwards, to complete the ride.

Elements
Cobra Roll (Boomerang)
Loop
2 Lift Hills

Train
Single train with 7 cars. Riders are arranged 2 across in 2 rows for a total of 28 riders.

See also
 Boomerang (roller coaster)

References

External links
Official page

Roller coasters introduced in 2000
Roller coasters in Missouri
Worlds of Fun
Roller coasters operated by Cedar Fair